{{DISPLAYTITLE:5-HT6 receptor}}

The 5HT6 receptor is a subtype of 5HT receptor that binds the endogenous neurotransmitter serotonin (5-hydroxytryptamine, 5HT). It is a G protein-coupled receptor (GPCR) that is coupled to Gs and mediates excitatory neurotransmission. HTR6 denotes the human gene encoding for the receptor.

Distribution
The 5HT6 receptor is expressed almost exclusively in the brain. It is distributed in various areas including, but not limited to, the olfactory tubercle, cerebral cortex (frontal and entorhinal regions), nucleus accumbens, striatum, caudate nucleus, hippocampus, and the molecular layer of the cerebellum. Based on its abundance in extrapyramidal, limbic, and cortical regions it can be suggested that the 5HT6 receptor plays a role in functions like motor control, emotionality, cognition, and memory.

Function 
Blockade of central 5HT6 receptors has been shown to increase glutamatergic and cholinergic neurotransmission in various brain areas, whereas activation enhances GABAergic signaling in a widespread manner. Antagonism of 5HT6 receptors also facilitates dopamine and norepinephrine release in the frontal cortex, while stimulation has the opposite effect.

As a drug target for antagonists
Despite the 5HT6 receptor having a functionally excitatory action, it is largely co-localized with GABAergic neurons and therefore produces an overall inhibition of brain activity. In parallel with this, 5HT6 antagonists are hypothesized to improve cognition, learning, and memory. Agents such as latrepirdine, idalopirdine (Lu AE58054), and intepirdine (SB-742,457/RVT-101) were evaluated as novel treatments for Alzheimer's disease and other forms of dementia. However, phase III trials of latrepirdine, idalopirdine, and intepirdine have failed to demonstrate efficacy.

5HT6 antagonists have also been shown to reduce appetite and produce weight loss, and as a result, PRX-07034, BVT-5,182, and BVT-74,316 are being investigated for the treatment of obesity.

As a drug target for agonists
Recently, the 5HT6 agonists WAY-181,187 and WAY-208,466 have been demonstrated to be active in rodent models of depression, anxiety, and obsessive-compulsive disorder (OCD), and such agents may be useful treatments for these conditions. Additionally, indirect 5HT6 activation may play a role in the therapeutic benefits of serotonergic antidepressants like the selective serotonin reuptake inhibitors (SSRIs) and tricyclic antidepressants (TCAs).

Ligands
A large number of selective 5HT6 ligands have now been developed.

Agonists

Full agonists

 2-Ethyl-5-methoxy-N,N-dimethyltryptamine (EMDT)
 WAY-181,187
 WAY-208,466
 N-(inden-5-yl)imidazothiazole-5-sulfonamide (43): Ki = 4.5nM, EC50 = 0.9nM, Emax = 98%
 E-6837 – Full agonist at human 5HT6 receptors

Partial agonists
 E-6801
 E-6837 – partial agonist at rat 5-HT6 receptors. Orally active in rats, and caused weight loss with chronic administration
 EMD-386,088 – potent partial agonist (EC50 = 1 nM) but non-selective
 LSD – Emax = 60%

Antagonists and inverse agonists

 ALX-1161
 AVN-211
 BVT-5182
 BVT-74316
 Cerlapirdine – selective
 EGIS-12233 – mixed 5HT6 / 5HT7 antagonist
 Idalopirdine (Lu AE58054) – selective
 Intepirdine (SB-742,457/RVT-101) – selective antagonist
 Landipirdine (RO-5025181, SYN-120)
 Latrepirdine (non-selective) and analogues
 MS-245
 PRX-07034
 SB-258,585
 SB-271,046
 SB-357,134
 SB-399,885
 SGS 518 Fb: [445441-26-9]
 Ro 04-6790
 Ro-4368554
 Atypical antipsychotics (sertindole, olanzapine, asenapine, clozapine)
 WAY-255315 / SAM-315: Ki = 1.1 nM, IC50 = 13 nM
 Rosa rugosa extract

Genetics 

Polymorphisms in the HTR6 gene are associated with neuropsychiatric disorders. For example, an association between the C267T (rs1805054) polymorphism and Alzheimer's disease has been shown.
Others have studied the polymorphism in relation to Parkinson's disease.

See also 
 5-HT receptor
 5-HT1 receptor
 5-HT2 receptor
 5-HT3 receptor
 5-HT4 receptor
 5-HT5 receptor

References

Further reading

External links 
 
 
 

Serotonin receptors